Surayya Tyabji (born 1919 in Hyderabad, India) was an Indian artist, who contributed to the design of today’s Indian National Flag.

Work
Historian Trevor Royle wrote in his book The Last Days of the Raj that Badruddin Tyabji designed the final form of the current Indian national flag, the tricolour with Ashoka's Dharmachakra in the centre. Surayya Tyabji made the first copy that flew on Nehru's car on the night of independence: 

She also served as the member of various committees under the Constituent Assembly.

Surayya Tyabji's daughter, social worker, designer and activist Laila Tyabji wrote in 2018 that both her mother and her father were involved in the design of the flag, having been commissioned by Nehru to do so, as a development of a design by the soldier, scientist and lecturer Pingali Venkayya.

Family and ancestry
She belonged to Tyabji clan who trace their ancestry to Bhoymeeah. She was the niece of Sir Akbar Hydari who served as the Prime Minister of Hyderabad from 1937-1941, and granddaughter of Lady Amina Hydari who championed the cause of Muslim women's education in Hyderabad. She was married to Badruddin Tyabji, a civil servant and later the Vice Chancellor of Aligarh Muslim University.

References 

1918 births
20th-century Indian artists
20th-century Indian women artists
Artists from Hyderabad, India
Flag designers
Tyabji family